The Plains Historical Society, PHS, is located at 816 East 3rd Street Kimball, Nebraska. The PHS is to collect, preserve and present to the public the history of Kimball, Kimball County, and life in the locale of the Nebraska Panhandle. PHS was established in 2003.

Plains Historical Museum
The Society operates a small building at 200 S Chestnut Street with artifacts and displays of western Nebraska from the early settlers to modern days. The museum has an outstanding arrowhead collection. Many local historical artifacts are on permanent loan.

See also
 List of Nebraska Historical Societies 
 History of Nebraska

References

External links
 NebraskaMuseums.org
 Topozone.com: Plain Historical Museum

Historical societies in Nebraska